Abington railway station served Little Abington, Great Abington and Babraham in Cambridgeshire. It closed in 1851, along with its line which was one of the earliest line closures in England.

References 

Disused railway stations in Cambridgeshire
Former Great Eastern Railway stations
Railway stations in Great Britain opened in 1848
Railway stations in Great Britain closed in 1851
Babraham